The Farah River is a river in western Afghanistan. The lower valley of the Farah Rud is fertile and well cultivated.

References

External links 
 Floods in Afghanistan (November 2006) at NASA Earth Observatory

Rivers of Afghanistan
Landforms of Farah Province